Praxis Bülowbogen is a German television series.

See also
List of German television series

External links
 

German medical television series
Television shows set in Berlin
1987 German television series debuts
1996 German television series endings
German-language television shows
Das Erste original programming